Urma was a village development committee in Kailali District in the Seti Zone of western Nepal. It was merged into Dhangadhi in 2015. At the time of the 1991 Nepal census it had a population of 7,997, living in 845 individual households.

References

External links
UN map of the municipalities of Kailali District

Populated places in Kailali District